Military ranks of China can refer to:

Military ranks of the People's Republic of China 
 Ranks of the People's Liberation Army Ground Force
 Ranks of the People's Liberation Army Navy
 Ranks of the People's Liberation Army Air Force

Military ranks of the Republic of China 
 Republic of China Armed Forces rank insignia

 
Military of China